KQSR (100.9 FM, "Mix 100.9") is a commercial hot adult contemporary music radio station in Yuma, Arizona also serving El Centro, California.

The station used to be known as "The Jet" and aired a classic rock format. It adopted the slogan "Star 100.9" and aired an adult contemporary format. The program Director since May, 2009 is Jeff Edwards, who also hosts the weekday midday show from 10am–3pm. His show includes The '80s Lunchbreak, an all 1980s hour from 11am to 1 pm. Jeff Edwards also hosts a Saturday morning 1970s show, 70's Spotlight Saturday from 8am until noon.

Edwards used to be program director/on-air personality at WTRZ-FM in McMinnville, Tennessee. He also spent 12 seasons as the host of the Penn State Sports Network Nittany Lion Scoreboard Show from 1992 to 2003.

Other personalities on Star 100.9 include the syndicated Bob & Sheri morning show, weekdays from 6–10 am, Misty, weekdays from 3–7 pm and the syndicated John Tesh Show from 7 pm to midnight.

Star 100.9 added Christmas music back on Thanksgiving 2017 all way through Christmas Day. On December 26, 2017, KQSR launched a hot adult contemporary format, branded as "Mix 100.9".

Construction permit
KQSR has been granted a U.S. Federal Communications Commission construction permit to upgrade to Class C2, increase ERP to 50,000 watts and decrease HAAT to 78 meters.

Previous Logo

References

External links
 Official Website
 

QSR
Hot adult contemporary radio stations in the United States